The OBEL AWARD is a global award presented annually to honour "recent and outstanding architectural contributions to human development all over the world."

The prize sum is €100,000, making the Obel Award one of the world's largest architecture prizes in terms of prize money.  The winner also receives an artwork by Tomás Saraceno. 

The award was founded by Danish businessman Henrik Frode Obel (1942-2014) and sponsored by the Henrik Frode Obel Foundation, based in Copenhagen, Denmark.  

Besides the annual award ceremony, The Obel Award produces books and publications and presents exhibitions and lectures on themes within architecture.

Laureates

Jury members 
 Martha Schwartz, chair. Landscape architect, urbanist, and artist, USA.
 Kjetil Trædal Thorsen, juror. Architect, co-founder and design principal of Snöhetta Architects, Norway.
 Louis Becker, juror and board member. Architect and design principal of Henning Larsen Architects, Denmark.
 Wilhelm Vossenkuhl, juror. Professor (em.) and philosopher. Germany.
 XU Tiantian, juror. Architect, founding principal, DnA, Beijing, China.
 Aric Chen, juror. Design curator and Artistic Director of Rotterdam's Het Nieuwe Instituut, based in Shanghai, China. 
 Sumayya Vally, juror. Architect, founder and director of Counterspace, Johannesburg, South Africa and London, UK

References

External links 

21st-century awards
Architecture awards of Denmark
Awards established in 2019